is a Japanese manga series written and illustrated by Hirohiko Araki, and is the eighth part of the larger JoJo's Bizarre Adventure series. Set in Japan in 2011, it follows Josuke Higashikata, a young man afflicted by retrograde amnesia, in his search to uncover his identity in Morioh Town, a coastal Japanese town affected by the Tōhoku earthquake and tsunami. However, his digging pulls him and his adoptive family into the unfinished business between his previous life and an impending inhuman threat. It was serialized by Shueisha in the seinen manga  magazine Ultra Jump from May 2011 until August 2021, and has been collected in 27 tankōbon volumes.

Plot
In the aftermath of the 2011 Tōhoku earthquake and tsunami, strange structures known colloquially as the Wall Eyes appear near the coast of the town of Morioh, with the ground beneath them gaining the ability to swap traits of objects buried within it. A local college student named Yasuho Hirose finds a mysterious amnesiac youth buried under one of the Wall Eyes, who she decides to temporarily name "Josuke," and the two set out to recover his memories and identity. Yasuho conducts her investigation while leaving the youth in the care of the Higashikata family, hypothesizing that Josuke is connected to a missing doctor named Yoshikage Kira. As Yasuho visits Kira's terminally-ill mother, Holy Joestar-Kira, Josuke learns that he is a fusion of Kira and someone else.

When Josuke later confronts the patriarch of the family, Norisuke Higashikata IV, over his reasons for taking him in, he learns that the Higashikata family needs Kira's memories to end a family curse that petrifies each of their first children. Kira had been involved with a fruit named the Locacaca, which can heal one part of its consumer's body by weakening another. Norisuke remains unaware that his oldest son Jobin has been illegally obtaining and selling Locacaca in coordination with a group of mysterious stone-based beings called Rock Humans, who seek to eliminate Josuke and ascend the ranks of society.

Josuke later learns that prior to his awakening, Kira and a certain Josefumi Kujo had grafted a Locacaca branch to a tree the Higashikata orchard, creating a new type of Locacaca that uses another person as collateral for the healing process. After Kira was fatally injured by the Rock Humans, Josefumi used the new Locacaca to cure him as the two of them fell into the site of the future Wall Eyes. Realizing that he is a fusion of Josefumi and Kira, Josuke resolves to retrieve the new Locacaca fruit and use it to cure Holy, just as Kira and Josefumi intended to. Meanwhile, Jobin's mother, Kaato, leaves prison after a 15-year sentence for killing a child to save Jobin's life. Even as Jobin reunites with his mother, he keeps his plot to use the Locacaca branch to cure his own son, Tsurugi, to himself.

At Norisuke's behest, Josuke meets with a plant appraiser named Rai Mamezuku, who he leads to the Higashikata orchard to identify the Locacaca branch. At the same time, Jobin's alliance with the Rock Humans falters, eventually forcing him to set the orchard ablaze to keep Josuke and the Rock Humans from obtaining the branch. Ultimately, two Rock Humans in an ambulance appear to seize the new Locacaca branch, unaware that Tsurugi has misled both them and Josuke's group using his own Stand; in reality, the branch remains in Jobin's possession. After defeating one of the Rock Humans posing as a doctor, the three heroes plan to hunt down the hospital's director.

The group encounters an intern at the hospital named Toru, who points them in the direction of hospital director Satoru Akefu. While attempting to pursue him, the three are attacked by Akefu's powerful calamity-based Stand, Wonder of U, being forced to retreat after a bystander is killed. While hiding from the police, Josuke and Mamezuku are again attacked by Wonder of U, leading them to realize that the Stand is triggered by intent to pursue. Josuke deliberately injures himself to be taken to the hospital, intending to make the hospital director pursue him. As he and the hospital director simultaneously pursue Josuke, Mamezuku realizes that Satoru Akefu is the Stand itself. Mamezuku is fatally wounded by Akefu, but reveals the latent Spin within Josuke's ability as he dies.

Meanwhile, Yasuho pursues her suspicion that the branch is with the Higashikatas, eventually revealing the branch to the family on accident. Norisuke confronts Jobin, who incapacitates him; Jobin himself is killed shortly afterward by calamity. As Toru arrives at the Higashikata estate, Yasuho realizes that Toru is the Stand User of Wonder of U. Yasuho calls Josuke and informs him of her findings. Akefu escapes Josuke's attack, but Josuke and Yasuho combine their abilities with the power of the Spin to attack Toru with a transient bubble. A gravely-wounded Toru eats a ripening fruit from the branch and attempts to initiate an exchange, only to be pinned to the ground by Kaato. Kaato forces Toru to exchange with Tsurugi and receive his curse, killing both Toru and herself. The last of the new Locacaca branch is destroyed in the process.

Josuke and Yasuho visit Holy in the hospital after reuniting. Though Yasuho glimpses Josefumi's mother in the parking lot, Josuke decides not to introduce himself to her, as he has accepted being neither Josefumi nor Kira. The two meet with what remains of the Higashikata family at a cake shop, as the family tries to decide on a cake to celebrate Norisuke's release from the hospital. The family eventually decides to leave the decision to Josuke as Yasuho takes her leave, satisfied that Josuke has found a loving family and a new life.

Characters

 Josuke Higashikata is a young man with no memory of his past or name. He is temporarily named "Josuke" by Yasuho after her dog. He later learns that he was originally Josefumi Kujo, a friend of the Kira Family whose body was fused with Yoshikage Kira's by the Wall Eyes and a new form of Locacaca fruit. He uses the Stand Soft & Wet, which allows him to produce soap bubbles that absorb an aspect of whatever object they touch, such as a person's eyesight or the friction of a floor. He later discovers another ability of his Stand he dubs Go Beyond, allowing him to shoot bubbles imbued with an explosive and transcendent form of the Spin phenomenon from Steel Ball Run.
 Yasuho Hirose is a young woman who discovers Josuke and helps him search for his true identity. She uses the Stand Paisley Park, which has the ability to direct things around Yasuho and send objects through wireless connections.
 Rai Mamezuku is a plant appraiser and fruit grower who works for the Higashikata fruit company. Norisuke asks him to assist Josuke in searching for, grafting, and harvesting a new type of Locacaca fruit. He uses the Stand Doggy Style, which allows him to peel his flesh like an apple, turning it into a ribbon that he can manipulate.
The Higashikata Family are the descendants of Norisuke Higashikata from Steel Ball Run. They suffer from an ancient curse that causes their firstborn child of every generation to turn into stone and die at a young age. The current members of the family live in Morioh and operate a financially-successful fruit company started by their famous ancestor.
 Norisuke Higashikata IV is the patriarch of the Higashikata family and the manager of his company's primary fruit parlor. Norisuke hopes to break his family's curse using Kira's knowledge of the mysterious Locacaca fruit, but insists upon following a righteous path toward his goals. He uses the Stand King Nothing, which has the ability to track by scent while changing its physical appearance to resemble the target it is tracking.
 Joshu Higashikata is a college student with an unrequited love for Yasuho. He uses the Stand Nut King Call, which allows him to materialize nuts and bolts through objects or people's bodies; that can be used to either detach objects or limbs from each other, or attach objects together.
 Daiya Higashikata is a near-blind teenage girl and the youngest daughter of the Higashikata family. She uses the Stand California King Bed, which allows her to steal people's memories and store them within chess pieces if they break one of her rules. When Josuke temporarily moves into her family's house, Daiya instantly falls in love with him and plots to manipulate him into returning her feelings.
 Hato Higashikata is a fashion model and the eldest daughter of the Higashikata family. She uses the Stand Walking Heart, which allows her to extend her shoes' heels into spikes to walk up walls and impale enemies.
 Jobin Higashikata is the eldest son of the Higashikata family. Jobin officially works in foreign research for the Higashikata fruit company, but secretly uses his position to launder money and Locacaca fruits for the Locacaca Smuggling Organization. Upon learning of the new Locacaca variant, he secretly plots to use the fruit to cure his son Tsurugi by any means necessary. Jobin uses the Stand Speed King, which allows him to manipulate the temperature of his targets and store heat in objects which can then be released as a trap.
 Mitsuba Higashikata is Jobin's vain wife and a model working for the Higashikata fruit company's advertising division. She uses the Stand Awaking III Leaves, which allows her to create vector arrows that will repel anything from the arrow's direction.
 Tsurugi Higashikata is Jobin and Mitsuba's son, an eleven-year-old boy who dresses as a girl to avoid the evil eye, in line with family tradition. Tsurugi fears his family's curse, allowing him to be manipulated by Yotsuyu after seeing him cure a petrified dog named Iwasuke. Tsurugi uses the Stand Paper Moon King, which lets him create origami that disrupts the perception of anyone who touches it, and additionally allows him to create origami from other objects besides paper and control any origami creatures he has made.
 Kaato Higashikata is Norisuke's ex-wife and the mother of Hato, Joshu, Daiya and Jobin. After Jobin accidentally incapacitated a child with his Stand at a young age, Kaato used the opportunity to save Jobin from the family curse, killing the other youth. She is released from Stone Ocean Jail after serving a fifteen-year sentence, with plans to take her share of the family's fortune. She uses the Stand Space Trucking, which lets her store objects or people between playing cards.
 Kei Nijimura is the Higashikata family's maid, and is later revealed to be Holy's daughter and Yoshikage Kira's sister. Initially suspicious of Josuke, Nijimura comes to sympathize with the amnesiac and provides him with a clue toward his true identity. She uses the Stand Born This Way, which appears when its target opens an item, such as a door or a notebook, and attacks by freezing everything around it.
 Holy Joestar-Kira is an ophthalmologist from T.H. Medical University Hospital and an associate professor at Morioh's T.G. University. She is hospitalized due to a condition that destroyed parts of her brain and other organs. It is later revealed that she was experimented upon by the Rock Humans in order to create new forms of medicine from the Locacaca fruit. She is the great-granddaughter of Johnny Joestar.
 Yoshikage Kira is a doctor who is a descendant of Johnny Joestar through his mother Holy. He was friends with Josefumi Kujo, who attempted to help him save Holy's life by stealing a Locacaca branch to use its fruit. After Yoshikage was fatally wounded by the Rock Humans, a combination of the new Locacaca's effects and the emerging Wall Eyes caused his body to swap traits with Josefumi's, creating Josuke. Yoshikage's Stand is Killer Queen, which can producing exploding pockets of air and summon multiple tank-like stands called Sheer Heart Attack.
 Rock Humans are a mysterious race of humanoid silicon-based lifeforms with the ability to turn into stone, having infiltrated Morioh under assumed aliases. The two groups active in Morioh have ties to both the Locacaca fruit and Jobin, and intend to silence anyone who learns of the former's existence. Josuke comes into conflict with these groups, which include the following members:
 Toru is the main antagonist of JoJolion. He is a part-time hospital worker and Yasuho's ex-boyfriend from high school. He is later revealed to be the leader of the Rock Humans and the Locacaca smuggling organization, seeking to obtain the new Locacaca fruit at any cost. Toru's Stand is Wonder of U, which causes anyone who attempts to pursue him or his Stand to suffer freak accidents referred to as "calamities". The Stand itself assumes a human form known as Satoru Akefu, posing as the Head Doctor of T.G. University Hospital.
 The Locacaca Smuggling Organization is a mysterious, secret smuggling operation that serve as the first group of antagonists Josuke must face. Their only goal is to smuggle Locacaca fruits into Japan and sell them at an immense profit.
 Yotsuyu Yagiyama is the first Rock Human to be introduced. He tricks Tsurugi into helping him kill Josuke, while also plotting to steal the Higashikata fortune. Yotsuyu's assumed public identity is that of an architect of some regard, the man responsible for designing and building the Higashikata family's house. Yotsuyu's Stand is I Am a Rock, which turns his target into a gravity well that pulls certain objects towards them.
 Aisho Dainenjiyama is a nervous and paranoid Rock Human, having been betrayed by a former girlfriend. He attacks Yasuho and Tsurugi when he realizes they are following him, forcing the latter to trick him into getting run over by a bus. Dainenjiyama's Stand is Doobie Wah!, which allows Dainenjiyama to create small razor-sharp tornadoes that automatically track down their target using their breathing.
 The A. Phex Brothers are twin Rock Humans who pose as street performers. Having played a role in the attempt on Josefumi and Yoshikage's lives, they target Karera before coming across Josuke. The older brother's Stand, Schott Key No. 1, allows him to transfer objects between his two hands; he uses it in combination with his younger brother's Stand, Schott Key No. 2, a soccer ball containing a poisonous gas.
 Tamaki Damo is a Rock Human and the leader of the Locacaca Smuggling Organization. He pretends to fall in love with Hato to infiltrate the Higashikata estate and track down his allies' killers, only to be mortally wounded by Hato and finished off by Josuke. Damo's Stand is Vitamin C, which allows him to render a living being's body malleable or completely liquefy them after they touch an object that has his fingerprints on it.
 The Locacaca Research Organization is a group working in the medical field. Their interest in the Locacaca fruit seems to stem from a desire to make Rock Humans the dominant species through medicinal breakthroughs.
Urban Guerrilla, formally known as Ryo Shimosato, is a gastroenterologist who is sent to kill Mamezuku before Josuke and Yasuho can meet him. He attacks the three of them alongside his pet Rock Animal Doremifasolati Do. Guerrilla's Stand is Brain Storm, which can cause hemolysis and melt the flesh of anyone that comes in contact with his spores.
 Poor Tom is a short, infant-like Rock Human with the face and personality of a grown man. He tells Jobin to bury his Stand in his family orchard to prevent Mamezuku from finding the branch, only to betray him and his son Tsurugi once he does. His Stand, Ozon Baby, can depressurize an area upon activation, inflicting depressurization sickness in seconds. Ozon Baby can also create illusions of itself, and getting close to these illusions will cause the body to cave in on itself from the intense pressure.
 Wu Tomoki is a Rock Human who poses as an orthopedic surgeon and Mitsuba's doctor. He is first seen by Yasuho examining Mitsuba's right ear, only to treat her again for the legs she lost in the following Locacaca-based procedure. He reveals Holy's research into the Locacaca fruit, but is killed when Josuke seals his fragmented head in medical cement. He uses the Stand Doctor Wu, which allows him to disintegrate into small independent stone fragments in order to manipulate and possess living beings.
 Dolomite, formally known as Masaji Dorokoma, is the only Rock Human not affiliated with either of the groups above. He was once a carefree, handsome man until he saved his blind girlfriend from entering a power plant, burning his body and destroying his arms and legs in the process. Jobin contacts him and asks him to take out Josuke after Damo's death. Dolomite uses the Stand Blue Hawaii, which can possess anyone who touches something that belongs to the user, including its previous victims. Any possessed victims will walk toward a specific target, albeit in a straight, linear direction and without perception of any obstacles.
 Ojiro Sasame is a surfer and small-time criminal who enjoys tormenting innocent women. His vile personality earned the ire of Yoshikage Kira, who eventually manipulated him into cutting all ten of his fingers off. Ojiro planned to kill Kira and frame him for kidnapping in revenge, but is instead defeated and interrogated by Josuke and Yasuho. Later, he attempts to steal the new Locacaca fruit for himself, only to be killed by Jobin and Tsurugi. He uses the Stand Fun Fun Fun, which can forcibly take control of the wounded limbs of anyone directly beneath him.
 Karera Sakunami is a college student with an unrequited crush on Josefumi Kujo. She is a crude and volatile extortionist who pays no mind to her past or future. Being a witness to Kira and Josefumi's deaths, she is pursued by the A. Phex Brothers and eventually aids Josuke in defeating the duo. She uses the Stand Love Love Deluxe, which can freely manipulate other people's hair.
 Joseph Joestar, commonly referred to by the nickname Fumi, is the grandson of Johnny Joestar from Steel Ball Run. In 1941, he meets an elderly Lucy Steel and accompanies her on her mission to investigate the Higashikata Fruit Company, only for the two of them to be attacked by a living guard rail. After saving Lucy and himself with his Stand, he travels to America out of concern for Lucy's health, but finds himself stranded in the country by the outbreak of World War II. He is the father of Holy Joestar-Kira, and two of his grandchildren from another daughter are featured in The JoJoLands.
 Shakedown Road is a location in Morioh where the residents are known for extorting visitors. Despite not being a person or Rock Human, it has a Stand named Les Feuilles that allows it to move people or things that are atop its ginkgo leaves. A legend from 1901 recounts how Johnny Joestar brought the Holy Corpse to Morioh to cure his wife's mysterious illness, incidentally creating the Stand; soon afterward, the Stand moved a boulder, which dropped onto Johnny's head and killed him.
 Milagro Man is the Stand of a well-known unnamed arms dealer who set his family, fortune, house and himself on fire after losing a 50-billion-dollar lawsuit. The Stand causes whoever destroys part of its previous owner's money to gain increasingly-large amounts of money until they are buried alive, regardless of their attempts to spend it. The only way to escape the Stand's ability is to either return the curse to its previous owner or pass it on to a new one.

Production

JoJolion is written and illustrated by Hirohiko Araki. It premiered in Shueisha's Ultra Jump on May 19, 2011, and ended on August 19, 2021, making it the longest running part of the JoJo's Bizarre Adventure series overall. Curses, he goes on, are the sins of the ancestors and this makes people , and if this curse continues it will only turn into . From these, the "curse" is lifted, this being the goal of the story.

On the inside cover of volume 2, Araki explained that the "-lion" ending in the title comes from both the Christian concept of blessing and the gospels ("evangelion" in Greek), and the Ancient Greek myth of Pygmalion.

Chapters
The first chapter title of each pair is the title that is used in the volumization of JoJolion. The second title is the title used in the original serialization in Ultra Jump.

Reception
JoJolion won the Grand Prize for Manga Division at the 17th Japan Media Arts Festival in 2013. On Takarajimasha's Kono Manga ga Sugoi! list, which surveys people in the manga and publishing industry, named JoJolion the 12th best manga series for male readers in 2013. The manga has been nominated for the 26th Tezuka Osamu Cultural Prize in 2022. JoJolion was nominated for the 53rd Seiun Award in the Best Comic category in 2022.

The first volume of JoJolion was the second best-selling manga for its debut week of December 19–25, 2011 with 237,374 copies sold. The second volume ranked third, with 204,791 copies, for the week of April 16–22, 2012. Its third volume debuted at number two for the week of September 17–23, selling 260,080 copies. All three were some of the best-selling manga of 2012; volume one was 46th with 534,996 copies, volume two was 53rd with 516,040, and volume 3 sold 457,791 copies for 69th. Volume four was number two for the week of May 12–18, 2013, selling 224,551 copies in its first week.

Notes

References

External links
 

JoJo's Bizarre Adventure
Fiction about amnesia
Fiction about curses
Seinen manga
Sendai in fiction
Shueisha manga
Works about the 2011 Tōhoku earthquake and tsunami
Fiction set in 2011